The Aksala Formation is a geologic formation in Yukon. It preserves fossils dating back to the Triassic period.

The fossils found include sea urchins such as Triassicidaris peruviensis.

See also

 List of fossiliferous stratigraphic units in Yukon

References
 

Triassic Yukon